David Scott House is a historic home located in East Fallowfield Township, Chester County, Pennsylvania. The house was built about 1800, and is a two-story, two bay, fieldstone Penn Plan style dwelling.  It has a gable roof and a log addition built in the 1980s.  The house stayed in the Scott family for over 160 years, until sold in 1965.

It was added to the National Register of Historic Places in 1985.

References

Houses on the National Register of Historic Places in Pennsylvania
Houses completed in 1800
Houses in Chester County, Pennsylvania
National Register of Historic Places in Chester County, Pennsylvania